Medad may refer to:
 Medad (name)
 Eldad and Medad (Biblical figures)
  - The French Minister of the Environment, in French Ministère de l'écologie, du développement et de l'aménagement durables
 Medad, Iran, a village in Khuzestan Province, Iran
 Theodore Medad Pomeroy (1824 - 1905), United States politician
 Medad (media), an Independent, Montreal-based, Persian Language E-Magazine